The 2012 CAF Confederation Cup (also known as the 2012 Orange CAF Confederation Cup for sponsorship reasons) was the 9th edition of the CAF Confederation Cup, Africa's secondary club football competition organized by the Confederation of African Football (CAF).

AC Léopards from the Republic of the Congo won their first title, defeating Djoliba from Mali with a 4–3 win on aggregate in the final. They earned the right to play in the 2013 CAF Super Cup.

Association team allocation
Theoretically, up to 55 CAF member associations may enter the 2012 CAF Confederation Cup, with the 12 highest ranked associations according to CAF 5-Year Ranking eligible to enter 2 teams in the competition. For this year's competition, CAF used 2006-10 5-Year ranking. As a result, a maximum of 67 teams could enter the tournament – although this level has never been reached.

Ranking system

CAF calculates points for each entrant association based on their clubs’ performance over the last 5 years in the CAF Champions League and CAF Confederation Cup, not taking into considering the running year. The criteria for points are the following:

The points are multiplied by a coefficient according to the year as follow:
2010 – 5
2009 – 4
2008 – 3
2007 – 2
2006 – 1

Entrants list
Below is the entrants list for the competition. Nations are shown according to their 2006–2010 CAF 5-Year Ranking – those with a ranking score have their rank and score indicated. Teams were also seeded using their individual 2007–2011 5-Year team Ranking. The top sixteen sides (shown in bold) received byes to the first qualifying round.

Notes
Associations that did not enter a team: Libya (seeded 10th with 16 ranking points and entitled to two entrants), Cape Verde, Comoros, Djibouti, Eritrea, Lesotho, Malawi, Mauritania, Mauritius, Namibia, Réunion, São Tomé and Príncipe, Seychelles, Somalia, Togo, Uganda
† According to the formula for calculating the CAF 5-Year Ranking, Angola, Ivory Coast and Zambia are tied 12th place with 13 ranking points. As stated in local media reports, Ivory Coast have two entrants, while Angola and Zambia have one entrant.
Unranked associations have no ranking points and hence are equal 19th.

Moreover, eight losers from the 2012 CAF Champions League second round entered the play-off round:
 Coton Sport
 AFAD Djékanou
 Djoliba
 Stade Malien
 Maghreb de Fès
 Al-Hilal
 Al-Merreikh
 Dynamos

Round and draw dates
Schedule of dates for 2012 competition.

Qualifying rounds

The fixtures for the preliminary, first and second qualifying rounds were announced on 9 December 2011.

Qualification ties were decided over two legs, with aggregate goals used to determine the winner. If the sides were level on aggregate after the second leg, the away goals rule was applied, and if still level, the tie proceeded directly to a penalty shootout (no extra time was played).

Preliminary round

|}
Notes
Note 1: FC Séquence advanced to the first round after Nania withdrew.
Note 2: Invincible Eleven advanced to the first round after ADR Desportivo de Mansabá withdrew.

First round

|}

Second round

|}

Play-off round
In the play-off round, the winners from the second round played against the losers from the 2012 CAF Champions League second round. The winners of the CAF Confederation Cup second round hosted the second leg at home.

The draw for the play-off round and group stage was held on 15 May 2012. For the play-off round draw, two teams were seeded (using their individual 2007–2011 5-Year team Ranking), and for the group stage draw, the winners of the play-off round ties involving them were seeded into Pot 1, and the winners of the remaining ties were seeded into Pot 2. Each group contained one team from Pot 1 and three teams from Pot 2.

|}

Group stage

The matchdays were 3–5 August, 17–19 August, 31 August–2 September, 14–16 September, 5–7 October, and 19–21 October.

Group A

Group B

Knock-out stage

Bracket

Semifinals

|}

Final

AC Léopards won 4–3 on aggregate.

Top scorers

See also
2012 CAF Champions League
2013 CAF Super Cup

References

External links
CAF Confederation Cup

 
2012
2